Dumbo's Circus is a live action/puppet television series that aired on The Disney Channel beginning on May 6, 1985, and featured the character of Dumbo from the original film. Reruns continued to air until February 28, 1997.

The cast members are human-sized anthropomorphic animals played by people in puppet suits using technology developed by Ken Forsse, the creator of Teddy Ruxpin. The same production technique was used for Welcome to Pooh Corner. Unlike Pooh Corner, the show never had NTSC VHS releases.

Many of the show's cast went on to star in the Christian radio series, Adventures in Odyssey. The wagon used in the show was seen in the late 1980s and early 1990s on the vehicle boneyard lot of the Studio Backlot Tour at Disney-MGM Studios in Lake Buena Vista, Florida. When the series first started, Sebastian is seen wearing only his hat, vest and short pants. After a few episodes, he is given a white T-shirt to go with it. Some of the puppets that were used for audience members in the circus were used for Mother Goose's Treasury.

Background
In the show, Dumbo has grown up, is finally able to speak, and has struck out on his own to begin his own circus. He and a cast of characters fly from town to town, in a wagon pulled through the air by Dumbo, performing their "greatest little show on earth". Other than Dumbo, none of the characters from the original film appeared in the show. Each character would perform a particular talent, which ranged from dancing and singing to telling knock knock jokes.

Characters

Main
 Dumbo (voiced by Katie Leigh) - Also known as the "World's Only Flying Elephant". Star of the circus, Dumbo still relies on his magic feather to help him fly. He can usually be seen pulling the Circus wagon from place to place up in the sky. Often breaks the fourth wall towards the boys and girls watching the show, telling them when it's time for a song or for the sideshow. Being an elephant, Dumbo's memory is usually very good (based on the expression "An elephant never forgets"), his hearing is very sharp and sometimes his sneezes are often strong - strong enough to cause some wind. Most of all he now has the ability to speak unlike in the original 1941 film where he was mute.
 Lionel (performed by Sharon Baird, voiced by Jim Cummings) is a high-pitched Brooklyn accented lion who serves as Dumbo's right-hand partner, popcorn vendor, ticket taker. and sideshow barker. He has a knot in his tail. Lionel was inspired by the character of Timothy Q. Mouse from the 1941 film and says goodbye to the viewers at the end of several episodes.  Lionel's voice is almost similar to Timothy Q. Mouse as well.  Unlike Timothy Q. Mouse, though, who wears a red drum major's uniform, Lionel wears a blue uniform (as do the performers in the circus band). Lionel, along with Sebastian, was with Dumbo when he first started out on his own.
 Sebastian (voiced by Walker Edmiston) is a purple alley cat who is usually reduced to janitorial duties and likes to nap any chance he gets. Sometimes tricks others (usually Q.T.) to do his own work, but sometimes his tricks backfire on him. In the side show, Sebastian has a ventriloquism dummy with him called Sly. Sebastian joined Dumbo and Lionel because Dumbo's mother promised Sebastian's mother that he could go with them.
 Fair Dinkum (performed by Patty Maloney, voiced by Hal Smith) - Also known as "Dink" for short, he is a koala who serves as ringmaster of the circus. As he is from Australia, he has the accent they have as well. There are a few things that Dink is afraid of - heights (so he's scared of flying) and drowning in the water being a few of them. His name comes from the Australian phrase, "fair dinkum". He was the first to join Dumbo, Lionel and Sebastian when they were just starting out.
 Barnaby Bowser (voiced by Will Ryan) is a goofy dog who is the circus clown and magician as "Barnaby the Great". Known for saying "Ah-hee-ee-ee-ee-ee" whenever he laughs, and sounds like he's from the south. His magic tricks don't always work out the way he wants them to. Good friends with Lionel and Q.T. He also gets scared easily. Often hums his signature song "I'm Just a Lucky Dog". Comes from a big family - Edison Bowser (who invented flea powder), Isadoga Bowser (a famous dancer who perfected the "Dog trot"), Julia Bowser (Barnaby's favorite as she invented the hot dog) and his famous Uncle Lattimer Bowser, III. Barnaby shares a trait with Rabbit from Welcome to Pooh Corner (also voiced by Will Ryan) - both are gifted magicians. The only difference is that Rabbit's tricks usually work well, whereas Barnaby's doesn't always work the way he wants them to (though it sometimes gets plenty of laughs). Barnaby was the last to join the circus after Q.T., and before Fair Dinkum's twin brother, Rinkum Dinkum, joined up.
 Lilli (voiced by Patricia Parris) is the only female character before Matilda appeared, Lilli is a beautiful cat who serves as a tightrope walker in the circus. Sometimes wears glasses because of her bad eyesight - mostly to see things that are very close like books, signs and to play checkers. Likes pretty things. Originally from Williamsport, Lilli joined the circus after Fair Dinkum, with her mom, Mrs. Lilli (also voiced by Patricia Parris)'s blessing. She comes from a long line of high wire walkers (starting with Great-Grandma Lilli, Granny May, and Mrs. Lilli), with Lilli carrying on the family tradition in Dumbo's Circus.
 Q.T. (performed by Caleb Chung, voiced by Ron Gans) is a slowwitted, but good-natured orangutan who is the resident strongman and calliope player. In earlier episodes, he was accompanied by a small pink creature while playing the calliope. He makes friends easily, and has other talents, like kite making. Sometimes doesn't know his own strength. Q.T. joined the circus after Lilli.

Others
 Flip & Flap are a duo who are usually seen during the side show, telling each other jokes. They are identifiable by their appearances - Flip has long rabbit ears, and Flap has a red afro and a pig-like nose & cat-like ears, resembling a vampire bat.
 Rinkum Dinkum (voiced by Hal Smith) - A later addition to the series, Rinkum is Fair Dinkum's older twin brother. In contrast to Fair Dinkum, Rinkum is much more brave and doesn't scare easily. Like his brother, Rinkum speaks with an Australian accent. He joins the circus as the resident stunt performer. During the Side Show, Rinkum puts on a show in which the audience has to guess what country he once visited and is pretending to be from.
 Matilda Dinkum (voiced by Mona Marshall) is another later addition to the series, Matilda is Rinkum and Fair Dinkum's younger sister and loves to dance. Also known as "Matty". Like her brothers, she speaks with an Australian accent. Her name comes from the famous Australian song "Waltzing Matilda". She becomes the honorary circus timekeeper, an idea shared by Lionel and Fair Dinkum.
 Lattimer Bowser III (voiced by Laurie Main) is Barnaby's uncle who is a famous explorer. He looks like Barnaby, but is much older, with a moustache (which he occasionally brushes with his hands), and wears a monocle and a pith helmet. Speaks with an English accent.
 Fira (voiced by Jim Cummings) is Lilli's aunt, who speaks with an upper class accent. Looks like Lilli, but whereas Lilli only wears glasses for reading, she wears glasses all the time. Finds Sebastian to be sneaky, even if he is a cat.
 Mrs. Jumbo is Dumbo's mother, whom he sometimes talk about. She gave Dumbo his circus cart, and promised Sebastian's mother that her son could accompany Dumbo and Lionel when they were first starting out.

Side-show acts
Sebastian and Sly
Flip and Flap
Flip and Flap at the Restaurant
Dumbo's Nursery Rhymes
Barnaby's Magic Show
Q.T.'s Knock-Knock Jokes
Lilli's Tongue Twisters
Rinkum Dinkum's Make-Believe
Lilli's Mystery

Lionel introduces all of the side-show acts.

Cast

Puppeteers
 Sharon Baird - Lionel
 Caleb Chung - Q.T.
 Charlie Edwards  
 Paul Fusco  
 Joe Giamalva  
 Richard Griggs  
 Frank Groby  
 John Lovelady - Flap
 Ron Mangham  
 Patty Maloney - Fair Dinkum
 Norman Merrill Jr.  
 Tom Reed  
 Mark Sawyer  
 Van Snowden

Voices
 Katie Leigh - Dumbo
 Jim Cummings - Lionel the Lion, Aunt Fira
 Walker Edmiston - Sebastian
 Ron Gans - Q.T.
 Laurie Main - Uncle Lattimer Bowser III
 Mona Marshall - Matilda Dinkum
 Patricia Parris - Lilli, Mrs. Lilli
 Will Ryan - Barnaby Bowser
 Hal Smith - Fair Dinkum, Rinkum Dinkum

Recurring songs
"Dumbo's Circus" (Opening theme song)
"When the Circus Comes to Town"
"The Marching Band Parade" (Dumbo, Lionel, Barnaby and the Chorus)
"Clowning Around" (Chorus)
"I'm Just a Lucky Dog" (Barnaby)
"Follow Me, Follow Me" (Lilli)
"I'm an Elephant Song" (Some episodes play it during the closing credits instead of "Gotta Fly")
"I Love a Circus" (Chorus) (Some episodes plays it during the closing credits instead of "Gotta Fly")
"Hand Clappin'" (Barnaby and Lionel)
"March to the Music"(Lionel)
"Dumbo's Up in the Air" (Chorus)
"A Genuine Clown" (Barnaby)
"One, Two, Three, Pop" (Chorus)
"More Fun Than a Barrel of Monkeys" (Barnaby)
"Gotta Fly" (Regular Closing theme song)

References

External links
 

Dumbo
Disney Channel original programming
1980s American children's television series
Television series by Disney
American television shows featuring puppetry
1985 American television series debuts
1985 American television series endings
American children's fantasy television series
American children's musical television series
Circus television shows
Television series based on Disney films
Television shows about apes
Television series about cats
Television shows about dogs
Television series about elephants
Television series about koalas
Television series about lions